The 5th Golden Bell Awards was held on 26 March 1969 at the Teachers' Hostel in Taichung, Taiwan. The ceremony was hosted by Yen Chen-hsing.

Winners

References

1969
1969 in Taiwan